Kittisak Siriwan is a Thai retired footballer who played as a midfielder.

Honours

2006 Thai Premier League championship with Bangkok University

International career

Kittsak has been play for Thailand in 2004 with 2 matches.

References
National Team Players

Living people
Kittisak Siriwan
1983 births
Kittisak Siriwan
Kittisak Siriwan
Kittisak Siriwan
Association football midfielders